Part Time is a live album by the guitarist James Blood Ulmer with the violinist Charlie Burnham and the drummer Warren Benbrow, recorded at the Montreux Jazz Festival in 1983 and released on the Rough Trade label.

Reception

Robert Christgau wrote: "Cut at Montreux around the time of Odyssey, Ulmer's strongest LP, this repeats four titles and is close to his weakest. The live recording dulls his sonic concept ... Which isn't to say he doesn't still outrock Pat Metheny"

Track listing
All compositions by James Blood Ulmer
 "Part Time" – 4:55
 "Little Red House" – 5:40
 "Love Dance" – 6:39
 "Encore" – 2:59
 "Are You Glad to Be in America?" – 3:38
 "Swings & Things" – 3:27
 "Mr. Tight Hat" – 5:03

Personnel
James Blood Ulmer – guitar, vocals
Charles Burnham – violin
Warren Benbow – drums

References

1984 live albums
Rough Trade Records live albums
James Blood Ulmer live albums